James Elisha Brown (12 May 1913 – 26 January 1974) was a Liberal member of the House of Commons of Canada. Brown was born in St. Marys, Ontario and became a lawyer after graduating from Osgoode Hall Law School in 1941.

He was first elected at the Brantford riding in the 1953 general election and served a term in the 22nd Canadian Parliament.

Brown did not participate in the 1957 election, but returned to Parliament for the Brantford riding in the 1962 election. He was re-elected there for successive terms in the 1963 and 1965 federal elections, then was re-elected at the newly configured Brant riding in the 1968 election. Brown left Parliament before the end of his term in the 28th Canadian Parliament.

In 1963, Brown chaired a Canadian delegation to the United Nations. He also served as Chairman of the World Federalist Movement-Canada in Ottawa. In his community, Brown served as Alderman of the City of Brantford and Chairman of the Brantford and Suburban Planning Board.

In 1955, he placed a motion on the Order Paper in 1955, urging that government consider extending the right to vote to all First Nations Canadians over the age of 21, who were ordinarily resident on a reservation.

In 1967, Brown introduced a private member's bill in the House of Commons, launching a successful campaign to lower the voting age to 18, from 21.

Another private member's bill he sponsored in 1969 advocated changing the name of “Dominion Day” (July 1st) to Canada Day.

Electoral record

References

External links
 
 Brantford Public Library: Members of Parliament

1913 births
1974 deaths
Members of the House of Commons of Canada from Ontario
Liberal Party of Canada MPs
Lawyers in Ontario
20th-century Canadian lawyers